The Royal Commission into Aged Care Quality and Safety is a royal commission established on 8 October 2018 by the Australian government pursuant to the Royal Commissions Act 1902. The Honourable Richard Tracey  and Ms Lynelle Briggs  were appointed as Royal Commissioners. The Commissioners were required to provide an interim report by 31 October 2019, and a final report by 30 April 2020. Tracey died of cancer in October 2019 and was replaced by Tony Pagone. The final report was tabled on 1 March 2021.

Background
The man's family made increasingly higher level complaints about his treatment. A 2018 Senate inquiry revealed that several incidents at the home were referred to police, and coronial inquiries into the deaths of residents were initiated. The Independent Commissioner Against Corruption (ICAC) in 2018 reported damning findings of maladministration against five individuals and Oakden. Former South Australian mental health minister Leesa Vlahos was severely criticised by the ICAC Commissioner. His report portrayed some of the most vulnerable members of society as “poorly cared for, forgotten and ignored”. Oakden closed in 2017 after it was revealed that a patient with Parkinson’s disease was beaten by another resident at the Oakden nursing home at least thirteen times between December 2016 and March 2017 and did not receive medical care, despite the matter having been reported to the Australian Aged Care Quality Agency.

On 25 July 2016, the ABC News current affairs program 7.30 broadcast hidden video camera evidence of the aggravated assault of an 89-year-old resident in September 2015. The video showed a staff member at the Mitcham Residential Care Facility eating the resident's food, flicking his face, force-feeding him, and pinning him down, prompting calls to legalise the installation of cameras in the private rooms of aged care facilities.

In September 2018, the current affairs program Four Corners broadcast a special investigation into the aged care sector and the abuse and neglect of the elderly in nursing homes. The Prime Minister Scott Morrison announced that his government would make a recommendation to the Governor-General that a Royal Commission into aged care be established.

Terms of reference
On 6 December 2018, the Administrator of the Government of the Commonwealth of Australia, Paul de Jersey  issued Commonwealth letters patent appointing The Hon. Richard Ross Sinclair Tracey  and Ms Lynelle Jann Briggs  as Commissioners and detailing the Commission's terms of reference.

The Commissioners were appointed to be a Commission of inquiry, and required and authorised to inquire into the following matters:

(a) the quality of aged care services provided to Australians, the extent to which those services meet the needs of the people accessing them, the extent of substandard care being provided, including mistreatment and all forms of abuse, the causes of any systemic failures, and any actions that should be taken in response;
(b) how best to deliver aged care services to:
i.  people with disabilities residing in aged care facilities, including younger people; and
ii. the increasing number of Australians living with dementia, having regard to the importance of dementia care for the future of aged care services;
(c) the future challenges and opportunities for delivering accessible, affordable and high quality aged care services in Australia, including:
i.  in the context of changing demographics and preferences, in particular people's desire to remain living at home as they age; and
ii. in remote, rural and regional Australia;
(d) what the Australian Government, aged care industry, Australian families and the wider community can do to strengthen the system of aged care services to ensure that the services provided are of high quality and safe;
(e) how to ensure that aged care services are person‑centred, including through allowing people to exercise greater choice, control and independence in relation to their care, and improving engagement with families and carers on care‑related matters;
(f) how best to deliver aged care services in a sustainable way, including through innovative models of care, increased use of technology, and investment in the aged care workforce and capital infrastructure;
(g) any matter reasonably incidental to a matter referred to in paragraphs (a) to (f) or that [the Commissioners] believe is reasonably relevant to the inquiry.

Commissioners and executive
The Honourable Justice Joseph McGrath and Ms Lynelle Briggs  were appointed as Royal Commissioners with effect from 8 October 2018. However, Justice McGrath stood aside for family reasons and, on 11 December 2018, the Australian Government announced that former Federal Court judge, The Honourable Richard Tracey , would replace McGrath. Justice Tracey died in California on 11 October 2019, while undergoing treatment for cancer he had been diagnosed with seven weeks earlier. Tony Pagone replaced Tracey as chair of the commission.

The Official Secretary to the Royal Commission is Dr James Popple.  Counsel assisting the Commissioners are Mr Peter Gray , Dr Timothy McEvoy , Ms Eliza Bergin, Mr Paul Bolster, Ms Erin Hill and Ms Brooke Hutchins.  The Australian Government Solicitor are Solicitors Assisting.

Powers

The Royal Commissions Amendment Act 2013 (Cth) was approved by Parliament to give the Child Abuse Royal Commission additional powers to fulfil its Terms of Reference. Notable changes were:
 Enabling the Chair to authorise one or more members to hold a public or private hearing
 Authorise members of the Royal Commission to hold private sessions
Royal Commissions, appointed pursuant to the Royal Commissions Act or otherwise, have powers to issue a summons to a person to appear before the Commission at a hearing to give evidence or to produce documents specified in the summons; require witnesses to take an oath or give an affirmation; and require a person to deliver documents to the Commission at a specified place and time. A person served with a summons or a notice to produce documents must comply with that requirement, or face prosecution for an offence. A Royal Commission may authorise the Australian Federal Police to execute search warrants.

Submissions

Public hearings

Reports
The federal government requested that the Commissioners provide an interim report by 31 October 2019, and a final report by 30 April 2020.

See also

Aged care in Australia
List of Australian royal commissions

References

External links
 of the Royal Commission into Aged Care Quality and Safety.

Aged Care Quality and Safety
2018 establishments in Australia
2018 in Australia
Aged care in Australia
Morrison Government